Hanna Konsek (born 21 January 1987) is a Polish footballer who plays as a midfielder for Ekstraliga club RTP Unia Racibórz. She has been a member of the Poland women's national team since 2006.

References

1987 births
Living people
Place of birth missing (living people)
Polish women's footballers
Women's association football midfielders
RTP Unia Racibórz players
1. FC Lübars players
Poland women's international footballers
Polish expatriate footballers
Polish expatriate sportspeople in Germany
Expatriate women's footballers in Germany